Jerold Oscar "Jerry" Quaerna (born October 9, 1963) was an American football player.  A native of Janesville, Wisconsin, he played college football at the offensive tackle position for the Michigan Wolverines football team at the University of Michigan from 1982 to 1986. By his senior year, he was six feet, seven inches tall and weighed 295 pounds. He started a total of four games at Michigan, two for the 1985 team and two for the 1986 team.  After graduating from Michigan, Quaerna started three games in the National Football League for the Detroit Lions during the 1987 NFL strike.

See also
List of Detroit Lions players

References

Detroit Lions players
Michigan Wolverines football players
Players of American football from Wisconsin
Sportspeople from Janesville, Wisconsin
Living people
1963 births
National Football League replacement players